Joel Grover Sayre, Jr (December 13, 1900 – September 9, 1979) was an American novelist, war reporter, and screenwriter born in Marion, Indiana.

Early life and education
Sayre was the son of businessman Joel Grover Sayre and Nora Clemens Sayre, a photographer and interior decorator. He was raised at Columbus, Ohio, and educated at the Columbus Academy in Ohio, and a private school in Cleveland. A childhood friend was James Thurber, later a distinguished writer. Sayre failed to join the American army aged sixteen, but with a falsified birth certificate succeeded in joining the Canadian army, being subsequently sent to Siberia with its Expeditionary Force. On his return, he read literature at Exeter College, Oxford, graduating BA in 1922, and briefly studied medicine at Heidelberg University in Germany.

Career
Sayre was the chief screenwriter for the 1939 film Gunga Din. His novels included Hizzoner the Mayor and Rackety Rax, which the New York Times called "incredibly funny".

Personal life
In 1930, Sayre married Gertrude Lynahan, a reporter for The World. She later worked in journalism as a fashion editor. Their daughter was the film critic and essayist, Nora Sayre. He died on September 9, 1979, due to heart failure.

References

External links

American male screenwriters
1900 births
1979 deaths
People from Southampton (town), New York
Screenwriters from New York (state)
20th-century American male writers
20th-century American screenwriters